The 2017 Tajik Cup is the 26th edition of the Tajik Cup. The cup winner qualifies for the 2018 AFC Cup.

The draw of the tournament was held on 22 May 2017.

Round 1
27 May 2017 

"Barkchi" - "Ravshan" - 2: 2

"Vakhsh" - "Somon" - 3: 2

"Hulbuk" - "Eshata" - 0: 0

"Zarafshon" - "Vahdat" - 0: 1

28 May 2017 

CSKA "Pamir" - "Panjshir" - 0: 0

"Regar-TadAZ" - "Khujand" - 2: 3

1 June 2017 

"Somon" - "Vakhsh" - 1: 2

"Vahdat" - "Zarafshon" - 3: 1

"Ravshan" - "Barkchi" - 0: 1

"Eshata" - "Hulbuk" - 3: 0

2 June 2017 

"Khujand" - "Regar-TadAZ" - 2: 2

"Panjshir" - CSKA "Pamir" - 1: 2

Quarter-finals

Semi-finals

Final

Scorers
4 goals:
 Dilshod Vasiev - Istiklol

3 goals:

 Mukhsinjon Parpiev - Barki Tajik
 Manuchekhr Dzhalilov - Istiklol

2 goals:

 Tohir Malodustov - Barki Tajik
 Shamsiddin Kosimov - CSKA Pamir Dushanbe
 Bilol Sulaimonov - CSKA Pamir Dushanbe
 Saidamir Mirzoev - Eshata
 Amirbek Juraboev - Istiklol
 Manouchehr Ahmadov - Khujand

1 goals:

 Sheriddin Boboev - Barki Tajik
 Vakhdat Khanonov - Barki Tajik
 Hussein Nurmatov - Barki Tajik
 Shahrom Samiev - Barki Tajik
 Daler Yodgorov - Barki Tajik
 Firdavs Chakalov - CSKA Pamir Dushanbe
 Bakhodir Chulibayev - CSKA Pamir Dushanbe
 Orzu Dodhudoev - CSKA Pamir Dushanbe
 K.Mirzonajot - CSKA Pamir Dushanbe
 Fatkhullo Fatkhuloev - Istiklol
 Muhammadjoni Hasan - Istiklol
 Romish Jalilov - Istiklol
 Ehson Panjshanbe - Istiklol
 Umed Azizov - Khayr Vahdat
 Muzaffar Fuzailov - Khayr Vahdat
 Oybek Abdugafforov - Istiklol
 Siyovush Asrorov - Istiklol
 Daler Tukhtasunov - Khujand
 Dilshod Bozorov - Khujand
 Shokhrukh Rajamatov - Khujand
 Farkhod Tokhirov - Khujand
 Parviz Akhunov - Vakhsh Qurghonteppa
 Naim Ibrohimzoda - Vakhsh Qurghonteppa

Own goals:
 Sultonsho Mirzoev (30 September 2017 vs Khujand)

See also
2017 Tajik League

External links

Tajik Cup News

References

Tajikistan Cup
Tajikistan
Tajik Cup